Ernassa sanguinolenta is a moth of the family Erebidae first described by Pieter Cramer in 1779. It is found in French Guiana, Amazonas, Peru, Suriname and possibly Ecuador and Bolivia.

References

Phaegopterina
Moths described in 1779